Sara Velkova (born 9 February 2002) is a Macedonian footballer who plays as a defender for the North Macedonia national team.

International career
Velkova made her debut for the North Macedonia national team on 27 November 2020, coming on as a substitute for Afrodita Salihi against Kazakhstan.

References

2002 births
Living people
Women's association football defenders
Macedonian women's footballers
North Macedonia women's international footballers